The Lancia Flavia (Tipo 815/819/820) is an executive car produced by Lancia in Italy from 1961 to 1971. Production continued as the Lancia 2000 from 1971 to 1975.

The Flavia was launched with a 1,500 cc engine at the 1960 Turin Motor Show by Lancia and introduced in major European markets during the next twelve months. Coupé and convertible versions developed by Pininfarina and Vignale quickly followed, together with one or two low volume "specials" including a Zagato coupé. Performance improved over the next ten years as the engine sizes increased, progressively, to 2,000 cc. The car remained in production until 1970 when it was updated and renamed the Lancia 2000. The Flavia was named after Via Flavia, Roman road leading from Trieste (Tergeste) to Dalmatia.

In 2011, Fiat announced that the Chrysler 200 convertible would be sold in Europe (LHD markets only) by Lancia under the Flavia name from early 2012.

In 1977, Singer Peter Gabriel released his first solo album with the cover depicting the artist asleep in the passenger seat of a 1974 Lancia 2000. The album is informally referred to as “Car”.

Chronology

The Lancia Flavia was developed by Antonio Fessia in the late 1950s, and introduced for sale in the UK in 1961. Initially available only as a four-door saloon, it featured a 1.5 L aluminium boxer engine, Dunlop disc brakes on all four wheels, front-wheel drive, and front suspension by unequal-length wishbones. This model was soon joined by a two-door coupé, designed by Pininfarina on a shortened platform. Vignale built 1,601 two-door convertibles, while Zagato designed an outlandish-looking lightweight two-door "sport" version. Only 626 of the Zagato-bodied models were built, plus three prototypes. Ninety-eight were 1500s and the remaining 512 received the larger 1800 engine.

The sport version has twin carburetors for extra power (just over ); however, this version of the engine was notoriously difficult to keep in tune. Even the single-carburettor engine suffered from the problem of timing chain stretch. Sprockets with Vernier adjusters were fitted to allow for chain wear, and the cam timing was supposed to be checked every . Early cars also suffered from corrosion of the cylinder heads caused by using copper gaskets on aluminium heads; nevertheless, the car was quite lively for its day, considering the cubic capacity. When leaving the factory, Flavias originally fitted either Pirelli Cinturato 165HR14 tyres (CA67) or Pirelli Cinturato 155HR15 tyres (CA67).

Later development of the engine included an enlargement to 1.8 L, a mechanical injection version using the Kugelfischer system, and a five-speed manual gearbox. In May 1967 a rebodied version of the Berlina with a new interior went on sale, with model number 819, it is usually referred to as the Series II. The engines were originally the same as earlier (74 mm stroke in 1500, 1800, 1800 fuel injected), but in 1969 these were changed to a new generation with an 80 mm stroke, narrow-bore versions of the new 2-litre 820-series engine. With the introduction of the 819, the Vignale and Zagato versions were discontinued, while the coupé model was on hiatus. The coupé version then returned with new bodywork, first presented in March 1969 at the Geneva Motor Show. The engine increased to 2.0 L in capacity, available with carburetion or injection, and four- or five-speed gearbox. The 2.0 L models were only made with revised Pininfarina coupé and revised Lancia sedan bodies. Then in 1971, after Fiat took control of the company, the "Flavia" badge was discontinued as were the smaller engines, leaving only the 2000 Berlina and coupé.

Engines

Performance
On the British market it cost £1,499 including taxes of 688.

By 1967 the engine size had grown to 1,800 cc. This put it behind the rival BMW 1800 TI for performance, though slightly ahead on fuel consumption. The testers commended the smoothness of the engine but found it lacked low speed punch. Overall they thought the performance "pleasingly deceptive" because the car was "faster than it feels". The UK car market was still insulated by tariffs, but with the BMW 1800 TI retailing at £1,498 and the Flavia's recommended retail price now £1,909, sales volumes were clearly not a Lancia priority. From the dominant UK domestic market player, the mechanically less sophisticated Ford Corsair 2000E was retailing at £1,008.

Models

Lancia 2000

The Flavia was revised and renamed the Lancia 2000 in 1971. The 2000 featured Girling disc brakes (replacing the Flavia 2000's Dunlops), stainless steel bumpers, and, for the fuel-injected models, Bosch D-jetronic Analog-electrovalve fuel injection. These were built until 1973 or 1974 although new models remained in stock until 1975. As with the Flavia 2000, the 2000 was only made with Pininfarina coupe and Lancia sedan bodies.

References

External links

 Lancisti.net - An Information Exchange and Support Community for Lancia Owners and Enthusiasts
  Web site entirely about Lancia Flavia
 Lancia Motor Club (UK)

Flavia
Sedans
Coupés
Convertibles
1970s cars
Cars introduced in 1961
Front-wheel-drive vehicles
Cars powered by boxer engines